The German Type Large MS Submarine was a class of submarine of the Imperial German Navy that was intended for deep sea usage and was very seaworthy, relatively comfortable and had average maneuverability.

References

Citations

Bibliography

Submarine classes
World War I submarines of Germany